mononymously known by her ring name Mirai (often stylized in capital letters as MIRAI) is a Japanese professional wrestler currently working for the Japanese promotions World Wonder Ring Stardom.

Professional wrestling career

DDT Pro-Wrestling (2019–2021)
Due to Tokyo Joshi Pro-Wrestling (TJPW) being the sister promotion of DDT Pro-Wrestling, Maiumi often competed in various of the latter's signature events. One of them is the DDT Ultimate Party branch of events, making her only appearance at Ultimate Party 2019 on November 3 where she teamed up with Raku, Pom Harajuku and Haruna Neko in a losing effort against Hikari Noa, Yumi, Mahiro Kiryu and Suzume. At Kawasaki Strong 2021 on February 14, she teamed up with Mao and Keigo Nakamura in a losing effort against Super Delfin and NEO Itoh Respect Army (Chris Brookes and Maki Itoh) as a result of a Six-person Tornado tag team match. At CyberFight Festival 2021, an event produced by DDT and TJPW in partnership with Pro Wrestling Noah on June 6, Maiumi teamed up with her "BeeStar" tag team partner Suzume, Haruna Neko, Arisu Endo and Moka Miyamoto to defeat Nao Kakuta, Raku, Pom Harajuku, Mahiro Kiryu and Kaya Toribami in a Ten-woman tag team match.

Tokyo Joshi Pro-Wrestling (2019–2021)
Maiumi made her professional wrestling debut at TJPW at Yes! Wonderland (Opportunity Is There), an event promoted on May 3, 2019, where she teamed up with Yumi in a losing effort against Bakuretsu Sisters (Nodoka Tenma and Yuki Aino). At TJPW 10 Vs. 10 - Red And White Winning Match on April 3, 2020, Maiumi teamed up with Haruna Neko, Hikari Noa, Mina Shirakawa, Miu Watanabe, Miyu Yamashita, Mizuki, Rika Tatsumi, Yuki Aino and Yuki Kamifuku as Team White to defeat Team Red (Hyper Misao, Mahiro Kiryu, Maki Itoh, Nodoka Tenma, Pom Harajuku, Raku, Sena Shiori, Shoko Nakajima, Suzume and Yuna Manase) in a twenty-woman tag team match. At TJPW Positive Chain on February 12, 2021, Maiumi unsuccessfully challenged Yuki Kamifuku for the International Princess Championship. At TJPW Yes! Wonderland 2021 on May 4, Maiumi teamed up with Suzume to unsuccessfully challenge NEO Biishiki-gun (Mei Saint-Michel and Sakisama) for the Princess Tag Team Championship.

World Wonder Ring Stardom (2021–present)
Maiumi and Thekla from Ice Ribbon kept attacking various wrestlers from World Wonder Ring Stardom under masks from the beginning of the first event of the Stardom Super Wars trilogy which took place from November 3 to December 18, 2021. Giulia would announce on December 25, 2021, that both of the masked superstars would join her Donna Del Mondo unit at the beginning of 2022.

On January 3, 2022, at the Stardom Award event in Shinjuku, Thekla and Mirai were officially presented as the mysterious silhouettes as they teamed up with her to defeat Cosmic Angels' sub-unit of Tam Nakano, Unagi Sayaka and Mai Sakurai. At Stardom Nagoya Supreme Fight on January 29, 2022, Mirai unsuccessfully challenged stablemate Syuri for the World of Stardom Championship. At Stardom Cinderella Journey on February 23, 2022, she teamed up with Giulia and Thekla to take on fellow stablemates Syuri, Maika and Himeka into a time-limit draw. At Stardom New Blood 1 on March 11, 2022, Mirai teamed up with fellow stablemate Mai Sakurai in a losing effort against Queen's Quest's Saya Kamitani and Lady C. On the first night of the Stardom World Climax 2022 from March 26, Mirai fell short to Wonder of Stardom Champion Saya Kamitani in a non-title match. On the second night from March 27, Mirai fell short to Utami Hayashishita by submission in a Singles match. On the first night of the Stardom Cinderella Tournament 2022 from April 3, Mirai defeated Mina Shirakawa in a first-round match. Due to Utami Hayashishita and Tam Nakano going into a draw and eliminating themselves from the tournament, Mirai would receive a walkover victory straight to the quarter-finals. At the end of the night, Syuri defeated Ami Sourei in a first round match. After her victory, she named her newly created stable "God's Eye". Mirai eventually stepped up to align with Syuri and Sorei after peacefully resigning from Donna Del Mondo.

Championships and accomplishments
Pro Wrestling Illustrated
 Ranked No. 78 of the top 150 female wrestlers in the PWI Women's 150 in 2022
World Wonder Ring Stardom
 Cinderella Tournament (2022)
 Historic X-Over Stardom Rambo (2022)

5★Star GP Award (1 times)
 5★Star GP Technical Skill Award (2022)

References

1999 births
Living people
Japanese female professional wrestlers
People from Iwate Prefecture